Lindsey Bashor (born 26 May 1983) is a Greek softball player. She competed in the women's tournament at the 2004 Summer Olympics, as well as the 2006 Women's Softball World Championship.

Bashor attended Santiago High School in Corona, California, where she won league offensive player of the year honors as a senior. She played for the Iowa Hawkeyes, leading them to the college national championship game in her sophomore year, during which she earned second-team all-conference honors. Bashor then transferred to Cal State Fullerton, finishing her college career with the Titans.

References

1983 births
Living people
Greek softball players
Olympic softball players of Greece
Softball players at the 2004 Summer Olympics
Sportspeople from Riverside, California
Iowa Hawkeyes softball players
Cal State Fullerton Titans softball players
Softball players from California